USS S-29 (SS-134), was a first-group (S-1 or "Holland") S-class submarine of the United States Navy.

Construction and commissioning
S-29′s keel was laid down on 17 April 1919 by the Bethlehem Shipbuilding Corporation's Fore River Shipyard in Quincy, Massachusetts. She was launched on 9 November 1922, sponsored by Mrs. Ronan C. Grady, and commissioned on 22 May 1924.

Service history

U.S. Navy
After duties in the northeastern United States operating from New London, Connecticut, in 1924, S-29 visited Hawaii from 27 April to 30 May 1925. Operating therrafter mainly from Mare Island, San Diego, and San Pedro, California until 1931, S-29 also served in the Panama Canal area from February to March 1926, visited Hawaii in the summers of 1927 and 1928, served in the Panama Canal area during February 1929, and again visited Hawaii during the summer of 1930.

Departing Mare Island on 14 February 1931, S-29 arrived at Pearl Harbor, Hawaii, on 23 February 1931. S-29 then operated at Pearl Harbor until 16 June 1939, when she departed bound for New London, which she reached on 23 August 1939. She then had duty in the northeastern United States and at Key West, Florida, from December 1940 to May 1941

After the Japanese attack on Pearl Harbor on 7 December 1941 brought the United States into World War II, S-29 moved to the Panama Canal area in late December 1941. In March 1942 she headed back to New London, where she arruived on 1 April 1942. She decommissioned there on 5 June 1942.

Royal Navy

On the day of her decommissioning, S-29 was transferred the United Kingdom. In the Royal Navy she became . While in British service she suffered a battery explosion at Weymouth. The Royal Navy returned her to the U.S. Navy on 26 January 1946.

Disposal
The U.S. Navy struck S-29 from the Naval Vessel Register in 1946 and sold her in the United Kingdom to H. G. Pound on 24 January 1947 for scrapping. In 1982, however, her hulk, minus its conning tower, was still visible at the Pounds scrapyard near Portsmouth. She finally was scrapped in Spain between 1986 and 1987.

References 

 After the Battle, issue no. 37, Plaistow Press, London, UK, 1982
 Photo gallery of S-29 at NavSource.org
 

United States S-class submarines
World War II submarines of the United States
Ships built in Quincy, Massachusetts
1922 ships
Ships transferred from the United States Navy to the Royal Navy